Kojdy  is a city in the administrative district of Gmina Łukta, within Ostróda County, Warmian-Masurian Voivodeship, in northern Poland.

The city has a population of 120.

References

Kojdy